Huicheng District is a district of Huizhou City, Guangdong Province, China. Huicheng is the northern urban center of Huizhou along with Huiyang as the southern urban center.

Administrative divisions 
Huicheng is responsible for the administration of ten subdistricts and eight towns.

References 

County-level divisions of Guangdong
Huizhou